Father Rami Elias (Arabic: رامي الياس) is a Syrian Jesuit priest specialized in psychoanalysis.

Biography 
Father Rami Elias taught Philosophy, Theology and Psychoanalysis for ten years at Centre Sèvres in Paris, France. He has been practicing Psychotherapy in Syria since 1985. He was appointed in charge of Jesuit scholars in the Middle East region, and teaches and lectures priests and nuns in Syria and Lebanon. Elias is also responsible for the Catholic Christian Education Committee, and supervises the Catholic Church educational centres in Greater Damascus.
He participated in the founding of the ‘Christian Theological Institute for Laity’ in Syria and launched with some lay people the ‘Joint Qualification’ project providing proper preparation to Church leaders in Damascus. He also contributed to the development of the official Christian education curriculum in Syria. In addition, he supervised the preparation of the ‘Syrian Christian Youth’ encounter with Pope John Paul II during his visit to Syria in May 2001.

Being a psychotherapist, Father Rami Elias participated in the organization of weekly psychodrama sessions in Damascus at the start of the Syrian crisis in 2011 which aimed to create an open space for people from different tendencies and faiths to meet and express their fear. However, these sessions were terminated after the arrest of one of the organizers, which resulted in people being afraid and refraining from participating.

Father Rami Elias is a member of the Catholic Synod in Syria founded by both the clergy and lay people, working towards reconsidering the Church doctrine and its religious discourse, in coordination with the Episcopal Council and the Eastern Catholic Synod in Rome. 
 
He founded the 'Watad' association in Syria  providing educational scholarships to students, psychological support to older people living alone, and vocational training courses for youth from all denominations looking for work opportunities.

Publications

References

External links 
 الإنسان قيد التكوُّن المستمر
 من أهم المحاضرات رياضة روحية عن علم النفس وضوء الايمان والحياة المسيحية
 جسد لماذا ولمن؟
 معرفة الذات والثقة فيها
 قراءة تحليلية لنص يسوع يشفي طفلاً في كفرناحوم

 

Psychoanalysts
Psychotherapists
People from Damascus
People from Latakia
Syrian Christians
Jesuits
1953 births
Living people